Sıraç is a  village in Erdemli district of Mersin Province, Turkey. The population of Sıraç  was 680.  as of 2012. The village was founded during Ottoman Empire and in 1865 some members of Karakeçili Turkmen tribe were settled in the village. The village was specialized in saddle manufacture. Its earlier name Saraç ("saddle manifacturer") eventually became Sıraç. In the 20th century the former prefession was replaced by farming, beehiving  and animal breeding. The springs around the village also contribute to village economy.

References

Villages in Erdemli District